Vaulx is a commune in the Pas-de-Calais department in the Hauts-de-France region of France.

Geography

Population

Places of interest
 The church of St. Martin, dating from the eighteenth century.
 The eighteenth-century chateau.
 The seventeenth-century chapel of St. Roch.

See also
Communes of the Pas-de-Calais department

References

Communes of Pas-de-Calais